Julián Edgardo Maidana (born January 11, 1972 in Lomas de Zamora) is a retired Argentine footballer. He's last club career was General Paz Juniors in the Argentine fourth division.

Career
Maidana  started his career at Club Atlético All Boys in the Argentinian Primera B. He obtained the championship and subsequent promotion to Nacional B in 1993, and after playing one season in that division was transferred to Gimnasia y Tiro de Salta in 1995 where he made his top league debut, and scored five goals in 35 appearances. In 1996, he moved to Instituto de Córdoba, before moving to Tallares where he made 117 appearances scoring 11 goals. In 2002, he moved to Racing Club in the Primera División making 11 appearances. He then moved to Scotland to play for Livingston in the Scottish Premier League before leaving in what were described as "acrimonious circumstances", and returning in 2003 to Argentina for a second spell with Talleres. In 2004, he again played in the Primera División, this time with Newell's Old Boys where he stayed until 2006. He them moved to Brazil to play for Grêmio. In 2007, he moved back to Argentina with Banfield, before moving back to Talleres for a third spell at the club.

References

External links
 BDFA profile
 Argentine Primera statistics

1972 births
Living people
People from Lomas de Zamora
Argentine footballers
Argentine expatriate footballers
All Boys footballers
Instituto footballers
Talleres de Córdoba footballers
Racing Club de Avellaneda footballers
Livingston F.C. players
Newell's Old Boys footballers
O'Higgins F.C. footballers
Gimnasia y Tiro footballers
Grêmio Foot-Ball Porto Alegrense players
Club Atlético Banfield footballers
Central Córdoba de Rosario footballers
Chilean Primera División players
Argentine Primera División players
Scottish Premier League players
Expatriate footballers in Scotland
Expatriate footballers in Brazil
Expatriate footballers in Chile
Argentine expatriate sportspeople in Chile
Argentine expatriate sportspeople in Brazil
Argentine expatriate sportspeople in Scotland
Association football defenders
Sportspeople from Buenos Aires Province